"Please Be Love" is a song written by J.D. Martin and Jim Photoglo, and recorded by American country music artist Mark Gray. It was released in December 1985 as the first single from his album That Feeling Inside. The song peaked at number 7 on the Billboard Hot Country Singles chart.

Chart performance

References

1985 songs
1985 singles
Mark Gray (singer) songs
Columbia Records singles
Song recordings produced by Steve Buckingham (record producer)
Songs written by Jim Photoglo
Songs written by J. D. Martin (songwriter)